The Sabios de Vargas baseball club became a founding member of the Venezuelan Professional Baseball League in its inaugural season of 1946. The team represented the city of La Guaira, Vargas and played its home games at the now-extinct Estadio Cerveza Caracas.

Team history
The VPBL opening game was realized on January 12, 1946. Besides Vargas, the circuit included the Cervecería Caracas, Navegantes del Magallanes and Patriotas de Venezuela teams, which resulted in a revised schedule of 30 games in which each team played its three opponents 10 times apiece. During the first season, the games were played on Thursdays and Saturdays on the afternoons, and Sundays in the morning. When the ballpark was fitted with electric lights, a game was added on Tuesday nights.

In 1946 Vargas was co-managed by pitcher Daniel Canónico and catcher Roy Campanella, both of whom led the team to the title with an 18–12 record. Notably, pitcher Roy Welmaker hurled in 25 of the 30 games, including 25 starts, and posted a 12–8 record with 139 strikeouts and a 2.68 earned run average in 181⅔ innings of work. Welmaker led the league in victories, strikeouts and ERA to win easily the Triple crown.

The league divided the 1946–47 season in two parts, while the number of games in the schedule was increased to 36. The final Championship Series faced first-half winner Vargas against Cervecería, second-half champ, in a best-of-five series. Vargas defeated Cervecería, 3 to 1, to become the first team to win consecutive titles in the league.

Vargas finished second in 1947–48, but retired during the 1948–49 season due to economical problems. Eventually, the team continued to play for the next four seasons but never was able to recover its initial prestige, before finally folding at the end of the 1952–53 season. They changed their name to the Santa Marta BBC in 1954.

Yearly team records

Players of note

Bob Alexander
Luis Aparicio, Sr.
Carlos Ascanio
Frank Austin
Frank Baldwin
Sam Bankhead
Clarence Beers
Frank Biscan
Roy Campanella
Daniel Canónico
Bill Cash
Walt Chipple
Larry Ciaffone
Al Cihocki
Claude Corbitt
Emilio Cueche
Clem Dreisewerd
Jim Dyck
Howard Easterling
Robert Elliott
Jonas Gaines
Ford Garrison
Tom Glover
Sam Hairston
Hal Hudson
Sam Jethroe
Walt Lanfranconi
Les Layton
Lynn Lovenguth
Clyde McNeal
Frank Mancuso
Don Newcombe
Andrew Porter
William Ricks
Harry Simpson
Hilton Smith
Tommy Warren
Roy Welmaker
Marvin Williams
Johnnie Wittig
John Wright
Lenny Yochim

Sources

External links
BeisbolVenezolano.net – Sabios de Vargas
PuraPelota.com – Sabios de Vargas
es.Wikipedia.org – Sabios del Vargas

1946 establishments in Venezuela
Defunct baseball teams in Venezuela
Vargas (state)
Baseball teams established in 1946